The word Dendroid derives from the Greek word "dendron" meaning ( "tree-like")

Dendroid may refer to:

 Dendroid (topology), in mathematics
 Dendroid (malware), Android malware

See also 
 Dendrite (disambiguation)